India has an Internet user base of about 636.77 million as of May 2020, about 40% of the population. Despite being the second-largest user base in world, only behind China (650 million, 48% of population), the penetration of e-commerce is low compared to markets like the United States (266 million, 84%), or France (54M, 81%), but is growing, adding around 6 million new entrants every month. The industry consensus is that growth is at an inflection point.

In India, cash on delivery is the most preferred payment method, accumulating 75% of the e-retail activities. Demand for international consumer products (including long-tail items) is growing faster than in-country supply from authorised distributors and e-commerce offerings. Long tail business strategy allows companies to realize significant profits by selling low volumes of hard-to-find items to many customers, instead of only selling large volumes of a reduced number of popular items. The term was first coined in 2004 by Chris Anderson.

In 2017, the largest e-commerce companies in India were Flipkart, Snapdeal and Amazon.
In 2018, Amazon beat Flipkart and was recorded the biggest ecommerce in India in terms of revenue. In 2020, Flipkart heavily outsold Amazon by almost two to one by sales during festive retail season.

In 2022, the pilot phase of the Open Network for Digital Commerce was launched.

Market size and growth
India's e-commerce market was worth about $3.9 billion in 2009. As per "India Goes Digital", a report by Avendus Capital, the Indian e-commerce market is estimated at ₹28,500 crore ($6.3 billion) for the year 2011. Online travel constitutes a sizable portion (87%) of this market today. Online travel market in India had a growth rate of 22% over the next 4 years and reach ₹54,800 crore ($12.2 billion) in size by 2015. Indian e-tailing industry is estimated at ₹3,600 crore (US$800 million) in 2011 and estimated to grow to ₹53,000 crore ($11.8 billion) in 2015. The market went up to $12.6 billion in 2013. In 2013, the e-retail segment was worth US$2.3 billion. About 79% of India's e-commerce market was travel related in 2013. According to Google India, there were 35 million online shoppers in India in 2014 Q1 and was expected to cross 100 million mark by end of year 2016.

CAGR vis-à-vis a global growth rate of 8–10%. Electronics and Apparel are the biggest categories in terms of sales. Overall e-commerce market had reached ₹1,07,800 crores (US$24 billion) by the year 2015 with both online travel and e-tailing contributing equally. Another big segment in e-commerce is mobile/DTH recharge with nearly 1 million transactions daily by operator websites. Year 2016 also saw online sales of luxury products like jewellery also increased. Most of the retail brands have also started entering into the market and they expect at least 20% sales through online in next 2–3 years. According to Google India Research in 2016, by 2021 India is expected to generate $100 billion online retail revenue out of which $35 billion will be through fashion e-commerce.

The ecommerce industry was reported at $24 billion in 2017 and was recognised as the fastest growing industry in India. The ecommerce market grew to $38.5 billion in 2018. It is estimated that one in every three Indian shops via smartphone and online retailers deliver to 20,000 pin-codes out of the 100,000 pin-codes in India. As per Goldman Sachs, India's e-commerce industry will reach $99 billion in size while online retail is expected to more than double to around 11% by 2024 from 4.7% in 2019 while increasing at 27% compound annual growth rate (CAGR). The online grocery segment that is below $2 billion will reach $29 billion in size by 2024. Online grocery orders will grow from 3,00,000 per day in 2019 to more than 5 million per day by 2024. Non grocery eCommerce penetration will be 16.1 percent by 2021.

As per property consultant Colliers International, the demand for warehousing of 5,000 to 10,000 square feet size will increase due to COVID-19 lock-downs which lead to a surge in online orders of essential items for same day delivery especially in tier-1 cities like Mumbai, Kolkata, Bengaluru, Chennai and New Delhi. Flipkart will debut a hyperlocal service called Flipkart Quick in Bengaluru to start 90 minutes deliveries. Amazon observed spike in page views with four times increase in “Add to Cart” during the lockdown, leading to doubling of sales. It also started selling auto insurance in partnership with Acko General Insurance which is available to users through Amazon app and mobile website. With opening of 10 new warehouse, the count of Amazon warehouse in India stands at 60 across 15 states that has an area equivalent to more than 100 football fields.

Report from software as a service (SaaS) provider Unicommerce shows increasing penetration of e-commerce beyond tier-1 cities with major growth coming from tier-2 and tier-3 towns/villages due to increasing vernacular language content and improving last mile delivery. Consumers are also diversifying their purchasing option from large scale e-commerce channels like Amazon or Flipkart to specific retail brand websites. As per Goldman Sachs, three or four players can co-exist in the e-commerce space given the size of India but travel, food delivery, ride-hailing services will see a maximum of two players capturing the market. Reliance Jio will increase competition in grocery, fintech, online retail, food delivery. From February 2020 to June 2020 during the Covid19 lock-down period, e-commerce increased by 117% with the delivery of only essential supplies that is now bigger than the pre-Covid19 level. Flipkart surpassed 1.5 billion visits per month with 45% growth in monthly active user while 30% growth in transaction per consumer. Tier-3 markets are showing 53% year on year growth with higher internet penetration and connectivity. Kinetic Green started selling electric auto rickshaw and golf carts online mainly in eastern and northern parts of India with a revenue of ₹75 crore in 2019 which now stands at ₹100 crore as of August 2020. E-commerce helped Nestlé increase sales at a rate of 122% which contributes to 3.6% of overall sales during Q2 of 2020-21. Apple Inc. is opening online channel to sell products in India for the first time during August 2020 to target the festival seasons.

Closures
Though the sector has witnessed tremendous growth and is expected to grow, many e-commerce ventures have faced tremendous pressure to ensure cash flows. But it has not worked out for all the e-commerce websites. Many of them like Dhingana, IndiaPlaza.in, eBay-India, Rock.in, Seventy MM amongst others had to close down or change their business models to survive.
In March 2020, the Government of India restricted online sales of all goods except for critical items including food, pharmaceuticals, and medical equipment. Many Indian startups including Urban Company, BookMyShow, Pepperfry and Nykaa, which did not feature in the government’s list of notified essential services, were running at a loss due to COVID-19 pandemic.

Infrastructure
There are many hosting companies working in India, some of which offer SaaS for hosting web stores. India has got its own version of Cyber Monday known as Great Online Shopping Festival which started in December 2012, when Google India partnered with e-commerce companies including Flipkart, HomeShop18, Snapdeal, Indiatimes shopping and Makemytrip. "Cyber Monday" is a term coined in the US for the Monday coming after Black Friday, which is the Friday after Thanksgiving Day. Most recent GOSF Great Online Shopping Festival was held during Dec, 2018.

In early June 2013, Amazon.com launched their Amazon India marketplace without any marketing campaigns. In July 2014, Amazon had said it will invest $2 billion (Rs 12,000 crore) in India to expand the business, after its largest Indian rival, Flipkart announced $1 billion in funding. In June 2016, Amazon agreed to invest another $3 billion to further pressure rivals Flipkart & Snapdeal Amazon has also entered grocery segment with its Kirana now in Bangalore and is also planning to enter in various other cities like Delhi, Mumbai and Chennai and faces stiff competition with Indian startups. A large proportion of traffic towards e-commerce sites is driven by coupon sites.

Funding
Examples of venture capital firms having invested in e-commerce companies in India are as follows:
Flipkart.com raised about US$2.3 billion. On 10 July 2013, Flipkart announced it had received $200 million from existing investors Tiger Global, Naspers, Accel Partners, and ICONIQ Capital, and an additional $160 million from Dragoneer Investment Group, Morgan Stanley Wealth Management, Sofina, Vulcan Inc. and more from Tiger Global.

In February 2014, online fashion retailer Myntra.com raised $50 million from a group of investors led by Premji Invest, the investment company floated by Azim Premji, Chairman of Wipro. May 2014 also witnessed an acquisition of Myntra by Flipkart reportedly for ₹2,000 crores.

In September 2015, PepperTap raised $36 million from Snapdeal and others.

In July 2020, Purplle raised $30 million from Goldman Sachs and others.

In January 2021, B2B Udaan has raised $280 million from new investors Moonstone Capital Partners and Octahedron Capital, besides existing investors Lightspeed Venture Partners, DST Global, GGV Capital, Altimeter Capital and Tencent Holdings.

Niche retailers
The spread of e-commerce has led to the rise of several niche players who largely specialize their products around a specific theme. As many as 1,06,086 websites were registered daily and more than 25% are for niche businesses.

During 2014, Royal Enfield sold 200 bikes of special series online.

Online apparel is one of the more popular verticals, which along with computers and consumer electronics make up 42% of the total retail e-commerce sales. Niche online merchandising brands like Headbanger's Merch, Redwolf and No Nasties partner with and even help sustain independent musicians. Some established brands like Arvind are now creating clothing lines just for the e-commerce markets. Some of the bigger online retailer like VoxPop Clothing have secured multiple rounds of funding, the last round raising $1 million from Blume Ventures in 2014.

As these niche businesses get popular, they are slowly getting acquired by the big players. BabyOye was acquired by Mahindra Retail, part of the $17 billion Mahindra Group. Ekstop was acquired by the Godrej Group to complement their offline chain of Nature's Basket stores.

Mergers and acquisitions
According to a report by Grant Thronton, as much as US$2.1 billion worth of mergers and acquisitions were inked in 2017 in the booming Indian e-commerce industry. Here is the list of Mergers & Acquisitions which happened in India over a period of time:

Regulation 
Foreign e-commerce is subject to regulations in India; under local law, foreign companies are to serve solely as marketplaces between vendors and their customers, and are forbidden from holding inventory in the country. Under new regulations effective 1 February 2019, foreign companies will be forbidden from selling any products from vendors that they control or have equity stakes in, and it is forbidden to enter into exclusivity deals between vendors and websites. This regulation is seen as a counter to Amazon and Walmart's influence on the market, which have given smaller traders a disadvantage in the market.

See also
Disintermediation

Facts

External links

 
Entrepreneurship in India